Puah Rakovsky (1865–1955) was a professional educator, Zionist activist and feminist leader. She worked towards upliftment of Jewish women.

Early life
Rakovsky was born on July 3, 1865, in Bialystok, Poland in a traditionally prosperous Jewish family. Her father Menahem Mendel was a trained rabbi, worked as a commission agent and was seventeen years old at her birth. Her mother was fifteen when Rakovsky was born. She was the oldest child of her parents and had fourteen siblings.

Personal life
Rakovsky married four times and had three children – two daughters and a son. She moved to Israel in 1935.

Education
Rakovsky was homeschooled and studied Hebrew, Yiddish and secular subjects. She had to discontinue studies when she was married at the age of 16 to Shlomo Malchin who was ten years older. She persuaded her family to let her study and attained a teaching license.

Career
Rakovsky took up teaching in 1889. She taught Hebrew in a girls' school in Lomza, Poland. In 1891, she was employed by a Jewish girls' school in Warsaw as a teacher and director. In 1893, she opened a school for girls where Hebrew and Jewish was taught to female students. This school ran until World War I and was of national importance.

In Warsaw, Rakovsky became an active member of the Zionist community. Even with her work on the community, she focused on women and their upliftment. Her extensive work and vocal activism led her to be a popular figure in the country.

In 1920, Rakovsky founded the Jewish Women’s Association (YFA) in Warsaw which came to be known as a national organization for Zionism and feminist by its belief. The association worked towards providing secular and vocational education to Jewish women and to prepare them to be independent.

Notable work
In 1940–42, her memoirs were published in Hebrew and Yiddish. In her autobiography, she labeled herself a "Radical Jewish Woman".

 Di yidishe froy, Warsaw, 1918;
 Modern day froyen-bavegung, Warsaw, 1928;
 Lo Nikhnati, translated and abridged by David Kalai, Tel Aviv, 1951;
 Puah Rakovsky, P.E. Hyman; trans. B. Harshav (ed.), My Life as a Radical Jewish Woman: Memoirs of a Zionist Feminist in Poland, (2002).

References

1865 births
19th-century Polish Jews
1955 deaths
People from Białystok